Tom Homer is the name of:

 Tom Homer (footballer) (1886-?), English footballer
 Tom Homer (rugby union) (born 1990), English rugby union player